Protein FAM3C is a protein that in humans is encoded by the FAM3C gene.

Function 
This gene is a member of the family with sequence similarity 3 (FAM3) family and encodes a secreted protein with a GG domain. A change in expression of this protein has been noted in pancreatic cancer-derived cells. Alternate transcriptional splice variants which encode the same protein have been characterized. FAM3C functions and expression also were studied in mammalian brains which shown that a reduced FAM3C level associated to the onset of sporadic Alzheimer's disease (AD), which highlighted FAM3C as a promising therapeutic target for Alzheimer's disease. Moreover, level of FAM3C was claimed to be a biomarker for AD together with saposin D.

References

Further reading